Albert Boromeo (10 May 1892 – 19 April 1971) was an Australian rules footballer who played for the Carlton Football Club and Richmond Football Club in the Victorian Football League (VFL).

Notes

External links 

		
Bert Boromeo's profile at Blueseum

1892 births
Australian rules footballers from Victoria (Australia)
Carlton Football Club players
Richmond Football Club players
1971 deaths